Martin Poell (20 March 1845 – 2 January 1891) was a Dutch Catholic missionary prelate and bishop of the Roman Catholic Diocese of Lu'an from 1890 to 1891.

Biography
Martin Poell was born in Weert, Limburg, Kingdom of the Netherlands, on 20 March 1845. He joined the Franciscans in 1861. He was ordained a priest in 1869. In 1873, he was sent to the Qing Empire to preach, first in Hubei and then transferred to Shanxi. On 20 June 1890, he was appointed bishop of the Roman Catholic Diocese of Lu'an by the Holy See. On 2 January 1891, he died of typhoid fever in the village and was buried in the Sacred Heart Church at the age of 45.

References

1845 births
1891 deaths
People from Weert
Dutch Roman Catholic missionaries
Dutch Roman Catholic bishops
Chinese Roman Catholic bishops